Surita Febbraio (born 27 December 1973) is a South African hurdler.

She won a silver medal at the 1999 All-Africa Games in Johannesburg, finished eighth at the 2003 World Championships in Paris, won the 2004 African Championships in Brazzaville and finished eighth at the 2005 World Athletics Final in Monaco.

Her personal best time is 54.05 seconds, achieved in April 2003 in Pretoria.

In 2006 Febbraio was found guilty of testosterone doping. The sample containing the banned substance was delivered on 13 December 2005 in an out-of-competition test in South Africa. She received an IAAF suspension from March 2006 to March 2008.

Awards
2003 – University of Pretoria Sports woman of the year

See also
List of doping cases in sport

References

References

1973 births
Living people
South African female hurdlers
Olympic athletes of South Africa
Athletes (track and field) at the 2004 Summer Olympics
Athletes (track and field) at the 2006 Commonwealth Games
Commonwealth Games competitors for South Africa
Doping cases in athletics
South African sportspeople in doping cases
University of Pretoria alumni
African Games silver medalists for South Africa
African Games medalists in athletics (track and field)
Athletes (track and field) at the 1999 All-Africa Games
21st-century South African women
20th-century South African women